Shabhalep, also known as sha phaley, is a Tibetan dish of bread stuffed with seasoned meat and cabbage, which is then fashioned into semi-circular or circular shapes and which according to regional variations is either deep fried or pan fried like pot stickers.

See also
 List of Tibetan dishes
 Chebureki — a similar dish in Slav culture.
 Pastel (food) - another similar dish

References

Tibetan cuisine
Beef dishes
Nepalese cuisine